Asadullah Matani (born 10 October 1998) is an Afghan cricketer. He made his List A debut for Band-e-Amir Region in the 2017 Ghazi Amanullah Khan Regional One Day Tournament on 16 August 2017. He made his first-class debut for Amo Region in the 2017–18 Ahmad Shah Abdali 4-day Tournament on 20 October 2017.

In September 2018, he was named in Balkh's squad in the first edition of the Afghanistan Premier League tournament. He made his Twenty20 debut on 7 September 2020, for Amo Sharks in the 2020 Shpageeza Cricket League.

References

External links
 

1998 births
Living people
Afghan cricketers
Amo Sharks cricketers
Band-e-Amir Dragons cricketers
People from Balkh Province
Balkh Legends cricketers